The 2022 Interwetten German Darts Open was the eleventh of thirteen PDC European Tour events on the 2022 PDC Pro Tour. The tournament took place at the Sparkassen-Arena, Jena, Germany, from 9–11 September 2022. It featured a field of 48 players and £140,000 in prize money, with £25,000 going to the winner.

 was the defending champion after defeating  8–3 in the 2019 final. However, he withdrew from the tournament before it started.

 won his seventh European Tour title, defeating  8–6 in the final.

Prize money
The prize money was unchanged from the European Tours of the last 3 years:

 Seeded players who lose in the second round and host nation qualifiers (who qualify automatically as a result of their ranking) who lose in their first match of the event shall not be credited with prize money on any Order of Merit. A player who qualifies as a qualifier, but later becomes a seed due to the withdrawal of one or more other players shall be credited with their prize money on all Orders of Merit regardless of how far they progress in the event.

Qualification and format
The top 16 entrants from the PDC ProTour Order of Merit on 28 June automatically qualified for the event and were seeded in the second round.

The remaining 32 places went to players from six qualifying events – 24 from the Tour Card Holder Qualifier (held on 7 July), two from the Associate Member Qualifier (held on 23 April), the two highest ProTour ranking German players, two from the Host Nation Qualifier (held on 23 April), one from the Nordic & Baltic Associate Member Qualifier (held on 4 June), and one from the East European Associate Member Qualifier (held on 25 June).

Seeds Michael van Gerwen and Michael Smith, and qualifiers Adrian Lewis and Darren Webster withdrew, with Martin Schindler and Dave Chisnall moving into the seeded positions and four byes being given in the first round.

The following players took part in the tournament:

Top 16
  (quarter-finals)
  (quarter-finals)
  (third round)
  (champion)
  (third round)
  (second round)
  (second round)
  (second round)
  (semi-finals)
  (semi-finals)
  (runner-up)
  (second round)
  (third round)
  (quarter-finals)
  (third round)
  (third round)

Tour Card Qualifier
  (first round)
  (second round)
  (third round)
  (first round)
  (first round)
  (third round)
  (second round)
  (second round)
  (first round)
  (second round)
  (second round)
  (third round)
  (second round)
  (first round)
  (second round)
  (second round)
  (first round)
  (first round)
  (first round)
  (quarter-finals)
  (second round)

Associate Member Qualifier
  (first round)
  (second round)

Highest Ranked Germans
  (first round)

Host Nation Qualifier
  (first round)
  (second round)

Nordic & Baltic Qualifier
  (second round)

East European Qualifier
  (first round)

Draw

Notes

References

2022 PDC Pro Tour
2022 PDC European Tour
2022 in German sport
September 2022 sports events in Germany